Jordan Officer (born 1976) is a Canadian guitarist who plays jazz, blues, and country music. He has worked often with singer Susie Arioli.

Officer was born in Montreal. He played violin and drums before taking up guitar at the age of fourteen. He performed with blues bands in clubs, which is how he met Susie Arioli, a Canadian jazz singer who also plays snare drum. In 1997, they added a bassist and formed a trio which performed in bars and clubs. During the following year, they opened for Ray Charles at the Montreal Jazz Festival. Officer cites Charlie Christian as an influence and has a particular fondness for the swing era. He has played mandolin with opera singer Nils Brown and has worked with blues musician Stephen Barry.

Discography
 Jordan Officer (Spectra, 2010)
 Victor Sessions (2013)
 Blue Skies (2014)
 I'm Free (2015)
 Three Rivers (2018)

With Susie Arioli
 It's Wonderful (Justin Time, 2001)
 Pennies from Heaven (Justin Time, 2001)
 That's for Me  (Justin Time, 2004)
 Learn to Smile Again (Justin Time, 2005)
 Live at the Montreal International Jazz Festival (Justin Time, 2007)
 Christmas Dreaming (Spectra, 2010)
 All the Way (2012)

References

External links 
 Official website

Living people
Canadian country guitarists
Canadian jazz guitarists
Canadian male guitarists
Musicians from Montreal
Swing guitarists
1976 births
21st-century Canadian guitarists
21st-century Canadian male musicians
Canadian male jazz musicians
Justin Time Records artists
Félix Award winners